Iftimie Ilisei Stadium is a multi-use stadium in Medgidia, Romania. It is currently used mostly for football matches and is the home ground of Medgidia. The stadium holds 32,700 people.

It was opened on 22 October 1978 and was known as the Municipal Stadium until 2008 when it was renamed after Iftimie Ilisei, the former mayor of Medgidia who built it.

It is the third stadium in the country by capacity (List of football stadiums in Romania).

References

External links
 Stadium profile at soccerway.com

Buildings and structures in Constanța County
Football venues in Romania
Multi-purpose stadiums in Romania